Depressaria moya is a moth in the family Depressariidae. It was described by Clarke in 1947. It is found in North America, where it has been recorded from California.

The wingspan is 18–19 mm. The forewings are fuscous, shading to blackish fuscous basally. The hindwings are light greyish fuscous, slightly darker towards the margins.

The larvae feed on Lomatium vaginatum.

References

Moths described in 1947
Depressaria
Moths of North America